Khaled Mohamed Abdelfattah Ibrahim (born 22 January 1999) is an Egyptian footballer who plays for Al Ahly as a centre back.

Career statistics

Club
.

References

1999 births
Living people
Egyptian footballers
Al Ahly SC players
Association football defenders
Egyptian Premier League players